Matthew Bowyer (born 25 July 1973) is an English cricketer.  Bowyer is a right-handed batsman.  He was born in Eastbourne, Sussex.

Bowyer made his debut for Buckinghamshire in the 1996 Minor Counties Championship against Hertfordshire.  Bowyer played Minor counties cricket for Buckinghamshire from 1996 to 2003, which included 12 Minor Counties Championship matches and 10 MCCA Knockout Trophy matches.  In 1997, he made his List A debut against Essex in the NatWest Trophy.  He played 4 further List A matches for Buckinghamshire, the last coming against Gloucestershire in the 2003 Cheltenham & Gloucester Trophy.  In his 5 List A matches, he scored 114 runs at a batting average of 22.80, with a high score of 43.

References

External links
Matthew Bowyer at ESPNcricinfo
Matthew Bowyer at CricketArchive

1973 births
Living people
Sportspeople from Eastbourne
English cricketers
Buckinghamshire cricketers